John-Ronald Andrew Esterhuizen (born 24 February 1991) is a South African rugby union player, currently playing with the  in the Currie Cup and Vodacom Cup.

References

External links

itsrugby.co.uk profile

Living people
1991 births
South African rugby union players
Rugby union wings
Golden Lions players
Alumni of Paarl Gimnasium
Rugby union players from Worcester, South Africa